Ash Mountain may refer to:

 Ash Mountain (British Columbia), Canada
 Ash Mountain, California, the administrative district of Sequoia National Park
 Ash Mountain Entrance Sign, a National Register of Historic Places-listed sign at the entrance to Sequoia National Park
 Ash Mountain (Montana), United States